Sigh No More is the debut studio album by British folk rock band Mumford & Sons. It was released on 2 October 2009 in the UK, and on 16 February 2010 in the United States and Canada. The album entered the UK Albums Chart at No. 11 and peaked at No. 2 on 20 February 2011, in its 72nd week on the chart and following its Album of the Year win at the Brit Awards. In early 2011, the album peaked at No. 2 on the Billboard 200 in the US.

In mid-2010, it was rated the year-to-date's 8th best record on NPR's All Songs Considered. On 20 July 2010, it was shortlisted for the Mercury Prize, awarded annually for the best album in the United Kingdom and Ireland. On 6 December 2010, a deluxe edition was released. This included the original album, a live CD of the concert from the O2 Shepherd's Bush Empire, and a DVD containing parts 1, 2 and 3 of the Gentlemen of the Road documentaries. On 15 February 2011, the album was awarded the Best British Album at the BRIT Awards. In the United States, it was the 3rd most digitally downloaded album of 2011, selling 761,000 copies.

The album's title is taken from a line in Shakespeare's Much Ado About Nothing and several other lines from the play appear in the title track's lyrics.

The vinyl LP version of the record was pressed by United Record Pressing in Nashville, Tennessee.

Singles
 "Little Lion Man" was released on 11 August 2009 as the first single from the album. The single has managed to reach number 21 in the UK Singles Chart, number 45 in the Billboard Hot 100, number 1 on the Billboard Alternative Songs chart, number 3 in the Australian Singles Chart and #1 in Triple J's Hottest 100 (Australia) of 2009.
 "Winter Winds" was released on 6 December 2009 as the second single from the album. The single has managed to reach number 44 in the UK Singles Chart.
 "The Cave" was released on 26 February 2010 as the third single from the album. The single reached number 31 in the UK Singles Chart, number 27 in the Billboard Hot 100, number 3 on the Billboard Alternative Songs chart, number 10 in the Irish Singles Chart and number 17 in the ARIA Chart. It was released as the second American single on 25 October 2010.
 "Roll Away Your Stone" was released on 3 June 2010 as the fourth single from the album. The single peaked at number 141 and number 10 on the Billboard Alternative Songs chart.

Critical reception

On the review aggregate site Metacritic, the album has a score of 68 out of 100, indicating "generally favourable reviews".

Commercial performance
Sigh No More was a slow burner, reaching number one on the Irish Albums Chart and number two on the UK Albums Chart six months and sixteen months, respectively, after its release.

The album sold over a million copies in the United Kingdom and over three million in the US. In the US, the album sold 626,000 copies in 2010 and 1,282,000 in 2011. As of May 2015, it has sold over 3.2 million copies in the US. It was the second debut album (after The Fame by Lady Gaga) to sell 1 million digital copies with 1,656,000 million copies sold.

Track listing

Personnel
 Marcus Mumford – vocals, guitar, drums, mandolin
 Winston Marshall (Country Winston) – vocals, banjo, electric banjo, electric guitar, bass guitar
 Ben Lovett – vocals, keyboards, organ, accordion
 Ted Dwane – vocals, double bass, bass guitar, drums
 Nick Etwell – trumpet, flugelhorn
 Pete Beachill – trombone
 Nell Catchpole – violin, viola
 Christopher Allan – cello
 Markus Dravs – production, "a nail and a piano string"
 Tom Hobden – original string parts on track 5
 François Chevallier – engineering
 Samuel Navel – assistant engineering
 Ruadhri Cushnan – mixing
 Bob Ludwig – mastering

Release history

Charts

Weekly charts

Year-end charts

Decade-end charts

Certifications

References

2009 debut albums
Mumford & Sons albums
Island Records albums
Glassnote Records albums
Brit Award for British Album of the Year
Albums produced by Markus Dravs
European Border Breakers Award-winning albums